Chen Po-liang (born 11 August 1988) is a Taiwanese professional footballer who plays as a midfielder for Chinese Super League side Changchun Yatai. He is also captain of the Taiwan national football team.

Club career

Early career
Chen started to display his goal scoring sense since young age. He was the top goalscorer in the National Futsal Championship, in which he scored 28 goals for Minzu Junior High School of Kaohsiung, in 2003. In 2006, he won the Golden Boot in Highschool Football League when he played for Chung Cheng Industrial Vocational High School. His talent has been recognized by Taiwan PE College professor Chao Jung-jui, who later encouraged him to take several tryouts in Japan, with teams such as Chukyo University, Yokohama F. Marinos, F.C. Gifu, and F.C. Kariya.

In August 2010, Taiwanese Football Association banned Chen's qualification in the 2010 Intercity Football League season due to his transfer to Taiwan Power Company F.C.

TSW Pegasus 
He joined Hong Kong football club TSW Pegasus FC on 21 January 2011. He helped the club to finish third in the 2010-11 Hong Kong First Division League season. He score a total of 3 goals for the club in the half season. He left the club for home in June 2011 to play for Taipower.

Taipower 
At Taipower, he helped the club win the 2011 AFC President's Cup. He scored 1 goal and made 1 assist in the final. It was the first ever Asian title for any Taiwan football clubs. Chen Po-Liang was voted the Most Valuable Player of the tournament.

Shenzhen Ruby 
On 2 December 2011,it was announced Chen would join Beijing Baxy F.C. reputedly on a RMB 25,000 monthly salary. However, Chen moved to another China League One club Shenzhen Ruby in February 2012.

Shanghai Greenland 
In December 2013, Chinese Super League side Shanghai Greenland Shenhua official announced that they had signed Chen Po-liang from Shenzhen Ruby.

Hangzhou Greentown 
On 11 February 2015, Chen transferred to fellow Chinese Super League side Hangzhou Greentown.

Changchun Yatai 
On March 12, 2020, Changchun Yatai announced that they had signed Chen.

International career
Chen was appointed captain of the national team in August 2009. He is the youngest captain in the national team history. On 25 August 2009, in an East Asian Football Championship 2010 semi final game, he scored two goals against Guam to help Chinese Taipei secure a 4:2 win.

In the 2014 FIFA World Cup Asian qualification first round matches, on 29 June 2011, Chen Po-Liang scored a goal in the 2-1 loss away to Malaysia. Back to Taipei on 3 July 2011 for the return leg, Chen Po-Liang scored a penalty but missed a second penalty as Chinese Taipei won 3:2 at home but lost the tie on the away goals rule. Chen was so upset with the penalty miss he cried uncontrollably and apologized to the 15,000 fans who attended the game at the Taipei Municipal Stadium.

Career statistics

Club statistics 
.

International goals 
Scores and results list Chinese Taipei's goal tally first.

Honors

Club
Taipower
 Intercity Football League: 2011
 AFC President's Cup: 2011
Changchun Yatai
 China League One: 2020

Individual
 Highschool Football League 2006 Golden Boot
 2008 Intercity Football League Golden Boot and Golden Ball
 2010 Intercity Football League Golden Boot
 2011 AFC President's Cup Most Valuable Player

References

External links

 
 Chen Po-liang at EAFF official site
 

1988 births
Living people
Footballers from Kaohsiung
Taiwanese footballers
Chinese Taipei international footballers
Association football midfielders
Taiwanese expatriate footballers
Expatriate footballers in Hong Kong
TSW Pegasus FC players
Shenzhen F.C. players
Shanghai Shenhua F.C. players
Zhejiang Professional F.C. players
Changchun Yatai F.C. players
Chinese Super League players
China League One players